Ģirts Dzelde (born 16 July 1963) is a former professional tennis player from Latvia, currently the coach of Latvian Davis Cup team. He achieved a career-high singles ranking of World No. 273 in 1991 and a career-high doubles ranking of World No. 108 in 1993. Dzelde did not win any ATP level titles in singles or doubles, but finished runner-up in three ATP doubles events.

Dzelde participated in 17 Davis Cup ties for Latvia from 1993 to 2000, posting a 16–11 record in singles and a 10–6 record in doubles.

Career finals

Doubles (3 losses)

External links
 
 
 

1963 births
Sportspeople from Riga
Latvian male tennis players
Universiade medalists in tennis
Living people
Soviet male tennis players
Universiade silver medalists for the Soviet Union
Medalists at the 1987 Summer Universiade